The Piano Concerto No. 5 in F major, Op. 103, popularly known as The Egyptian, was Camille Saint-Saëns' last piano concerto.  He wrote it in 1896, 20 years after his Fourth Piano Concerto, to play himself at his own Jubilee Concert on May 6 of that year. This concert celebrated the fiftieth anniversary of his début at the Salle Pleyel in 1846.

This concerto is nicknamed "The Egyptian" for two reasons. Firstly, Saint-Saëns composed it in the temple town of Luxor while on one of his frequent winter vacations to Egypt, and secondly, the music is among his most exotic, displaying influences from Javanese and Spanish as well as Middle-eastern music. Saint-Saëns said that the piece represented a sea voyage.

Saint-Saëns himself was the soloist at the première, which was a popular and critical success.

Structure

Instrumentation
The concerto is scored for solo piano, piccolo, 2 flutes, 2 oboes, 2 clarinets, 2 bassoons, 4 horns, 2 trumpets, 3 trombones, timpani, tam tam, and strings.

Recordings
Classic recordings of this work by Hisatada Odaka and Kazuko Yasukawa are not currently available. Selected recordings presently available include:
Magda Tagliaferro and the Orchestre Lamoureux, conducted by Jean Fournet. Recorded 1954. Reported on 3 CD set with other composers APR 2021. Diapason d’or
Jeanne-Marie Darré and the Orchestre National de la Radiodiffusion Française, conducted by Louis Fouretier. Recorded 1957. Reported on a 2-CD set with all 5 Saint-Saëns piano concertos (Emi classics 1996)
Philippe Entremont and the Orchestre national du Capitole de Toulouse conducted by Michel Plasson. (Columbia Masterworks) on a 2-CD set with all 5 Saint-Saëns piano concertos. recorded 1976
Jean-Philippe Collard and the Royal Philharmonic Orchestra conducted by André Previn. (EMI 86245), on a 2-CD set with all 5 Saint-Saëns piano concertos. Recorded 1987
Aldo Ciccolini and the Orchestre de Paris conducted by Serge Baudo EMI 585183, on a 2-CD set with all 5 Saint-Saëns piano concertos. Recorded 1971
Idil Biret, piano, Bilkent Symphony Orchestra, conducted by Jean Fournet. CD IBA BMP. Recorded 1999
Anna Malikova and the WDR Symphony Orchestra conducted by Thomas Sanderling, Cologne (Audite 92.510), on a 2-SACD set with all 5 Saint-Saëns piano concertos. Recorded 2010
Pascal Rogé and the Royal Philharmonic Orchestra conducted by Charles Dutoit. Decca 443 865–2 (2 cd set with all 5 Saint-Saëns piano concertos). Recorded 1981
Sviatoslaw Richter and the Moscow Youth Orchestra, conducted by Kirill Kondrashin. LP Le Chant du Monde, 1955 (reported on CD 2008)
Sviatoslaw Richter and the Radio-Sinfonieorchester Stuttgart des SWR, conducted by Christoph Eschenbach. CD Schwetzingen SWR Festspiele. Recorded 1993
Stephen Hough and the City of Birmingham Symphony Orchestra conducted by Sakari Oramo. Hyperion CDA67331/2 (2 CD set with all 5 Saint-Saëns piano concertos and other works). Recorded 2000. Diapason d'or, Choc Le Monde de la Musique
Mūza Rubackyté and the Lithuanian National Philharmonic Orchestra, conducted by Hans Martin Schneidt (with Piano concerto n°2, conducted by Alain Pâris). Live record. CD Doron music 2014
Louis Lortie and the BBC Philharmonic Orchestra (complete piano concertos n°1, n°2, n°3, n°4, n°5),  conducted by Edward Gardner (en). 2 CD Chandos 2018-2019
Bertrand Chamayou and the Orchestre National de France, conducted by Emmanuel Krivine. CD Erato 2019 - Gramophone Award, Choc de Classica
Alexandre Kantorow and the Tapiola Sinfonietta, conducted by Jean-Jacques Kantorow. SACD Bis 2019 - Diapason d'or, Choc de Classica
Clélia Iruzum, piano, Royal Philharmonic Orchestra, conducted by Jac Van Steen. CD Somm recordings 2020
Jean-Yves Thibaudet, piano, Orchestre de la Suisse Romande, conducted by Charles Dutoit. CD Decca 2007

References

External links

Camille Saint-Saëns Piano Concerto No. 5, "Egyptian", program notes by Barbara Heninger for the Redwood Symphony

Piano concerto 5
1896 compositions
Compositions in F major